The list of submarine classes in service includes all submarine classes currently in service with navies or other armed forces worldwide.  For surface combatants, see the list of naval ship classes in service.

Ballistic missile submarines

Cruise missile submarines

Nuclear-powered attack submarines

Non-nuclear attack submarines with air-independent propulsion (AIP) 

   
 Builder:  
 Displacement:  1,725 tons
 Operators:
  :  3 in service

 
 Builder: , 
 Displacement: 1,800 tons
 Operators:  : 2 building

  (Dolphin-2; AIP-variant)
 Builder: 
 Displacement: 1,900 tons
 Operator: : 3 AIP in-service/sea trials, 3 AIP ordered

 
 Builder: , 
 Displacement: 1,647 tons
 Operators:  : 3 in service
Qing-class submarine
Builder:  
 Displacement:  6,628 tons
 Operator:  :  1 in service

 Builder:  
 Displacement:  3,426 tons
 Operator:  :  1 on sea trials; 3 more building

 
 Builder:   / 
 Displacement:  1,590 tons
 Operator:  
:  4 ordered/building
:  2 in service 
:  4 in service , 1 under trials, 1 under construction, known as 
:  2 in service

 
 Builder: 
 Displacement: 4,200 tons
 Operators:  : 12 in service, last two boats not equipped with AIP in favour of larger battery

 Type 212 submarine
 Builders:  / 
 Displacement: 1,830/2,500 tons ("A" or "CD" variant)
 Operators: 
: 6 in service (A), 2 more ordered (CD)
: 4 in service (A), 3 more ordered with option for a fourth (A) – known as the Todaro-class
: 4 ordered (CD)

 Type 214 submarine
 Builder:  
 Displacement: 1,980 tons
 Operators:
 : 4 in service
 : 8 in service, 1 building/ordered
 : 2 in service
 : 6 ordered

  / 
 Builder:  
 Displacement:  1,145 tons
 Operator:  
:  2 in service
:  2 on a delivery program

 Yuan class
 Builder:  
 Displacement:  3,600 tons
 Operator:  
:  17 in service, 3 building
:  4 building, 4 on order

Diesel-electric attack submarines 

   
 Builder:   /  
 Displacement:  1,725 tons
 Operators:
  :  2 in service
 :  2 in service

  (ex-)
 Builder:  
 Displacement:  1,210 tons
 Operator:  :  2 in service

 
 Builder:  
 Displacement:  3,050 tons
 Operator:  : 6 in service

  (Dolphin-1; non-AIP variant)
 Builder: 
 Displacement: 1,900 tons
 Operator: : 3 non-AIP in-service

  (Project 877 Paltus and Project 636)
 Builder:   / 
 Displacement:  3,100 tons
 Operators:
 :  8 Kilo, 1 decommissioned, 1 transferred to Myanmar Navy, known as the 
 :  2 Kilo and 10 Improved Kilo in service
 :  11-12 original Kilo (877) in service, 10 Improved Kilo (636.3) in service, 3 Improved Kilo building/ordered
 :  2 Original Kilo and 2 Improved Kilo
 :  1 Kilo
 :  3 Kilo
 :  1 Kilo no longer active; used for dockside training
  Vietnam People's Navy:  6 Improved Kilo in service

  (Project 677 Lada)
 Builder:  
 Displacement:  2,700 tons
 Operators: :  1 in service; 2nd on sea trials; 4 more building/ordered (AIP propulsion originally considered but, according to shipbuilder, not incorporated)

 Ming class (Type 035)
 Builder:  
 Displacement:  2,100 tons
 Operator:  
:  14 in service
:  2 in service

Nagapasa class
Builder:  / 
Displacement:  1,400 tons
Operator:
 : 3 in service

 
 Builder:  
 Displacement:  4,000 tons
 Operator:  :  11 in service, 2 as training ships

 
 Builder:  
 Displacement:  1,653 tons
 Operator:  :  4 in service

 Song class
 Builder:  
 Displacement:  2,250 tons
 Operator:  :  13 in service

 
 Builder:  
 Displacement:  4,300 tons
 Operator:  :  1 launched, 7 planned ― equipped with Lithium-ion batteries

 
Builder: 
Displacement: 2116 tons
 Operators:: 1 (S-41) inactive (laid up); 2nd boat (S-42) sunk with all hands lost.

 Type 209 submarine
 Builder: 
 Displacement: 1,230/1,290/1,586 tons
 Operators:
 : 1 inactive (used for dockside training)
 : 5 in service
 : 2 in service
 : 2 in service
 : 4 in service
 : 2 in service
 : 7 in service
 : 4 in service
 : 4 in service; 1 (402) lost with all hands in April 2021
 : 6 in service
 : 3 in service
 : 9 in service
 : 14 in service
 : 2 (operational status unclear)

 Ula class (Type 210)
 Builder: 
 Displacement: 1,150 tons
 Operator: : 6 in service

 Victoria class (SSK 876)
 Builder:  
 Displacement:  2,400 tons
 Operator: : 4 in service 

 
 Builder: 
 Displacement:  2,800 tons
 Operator:  : 4 in service

 
 Builder: 
 Displacement:  2,600 tons
 Operator:  : 2 in service

 
 Builder: 
 Displacement:  370 tons
 Operator:  : 40 in service

 
 Builder: 
 Displacement:  2,000 tons
 Operator:  : 1 in service

 
 Builder: 
 Displacement:  593 tons
 Operator:  : 1 in service

 Type 206 submarine 
 Builder:    
 Displacement:  500 tons
 Operators:
  :  2 in service

Midget submarines 
 Yugo class
 Builder: 
 Displacement:  90 up to 110 tons
 Operator: : unknown; : 1;: unknown (reported in inventory as of 2019)

 Yono class
 Builder: 
 Displacement:  130 tons
 Operator: :  <36 in service

 Ghadir class
 Builder:  
 Displacement:  115 tons
 Operator:  :  21 in service

 
 Builder: 
 Displacement:   350-400 tons
 Operator:  : 1 in service

Special mission submarines 
 Belgorod (K-329)
 Builder: Sevmash
 Displacement: 24,000/30,000 tonnes submerged
 Operator: 

 Losharik
 Builder: Sevmash
 Displacement: c. 2,000 tonnes submerged
 Operator: 

 LR5 Deep submersible 
 Builder: 
 Displacement: 21 tons
 Operator:  (leased to Royal Australian Navy)

 NSRS Deep submergence rescue vehicle 
 Builder: 
 Displacement: 41 tons
 Operator:  (available for NATO) 

  deep sea rescue submersible (DSRV-1)
 Builder:  
 Displacement:  37 tons
 Operator:  :  1 in service

  special mission submarine (Project 1083.1)
 Builder:  
 Displacement:  730 tons
 Operator:  

 Uniform-class special mission submarine (Project 1910 Kashalot)
 Builder:   / 
 Displacement:  1,580 tons
 Operator:  

 Sarov (B-90)
 Builder: Krasnoye Sormovo Shipyard and Sevmash
 Displacement: c. 4,000 tonnes submerged
 Operator: 

 Al-Sabehat swimmer delivery vehicle
 Builder:  
 Operator:  

 VAS 525 mini-submarine
 Builder: GSE Trieste  
 Operator: : 1+?

Summary

See also 

 List of submarine operators
 List of naval ship classes in service
 List of auxiliary ship classes in service

References

Lists of submarines